Battiste is an English surname. Notable people with the surname include:

 Deric Battiste
 Harold Battiste
 Jaime Battiste, Canadian politician
 Marie Battiste
 Merle Battiste
 Wally Battiste

See also
 Batiste (disambiguation)

English-language surnames